Alex Bogomolov Jr. and Matthew Ebden were the defending champions but decided not to participate together.
Bogomolov played alongside Gilles Müller but withdrew before the second round because of a shoulder injury, while Ebden partnered up with Ryan Harrison to successfully defend the title against Xavier Malisse and Michael Russell with 6–3, 3-6, [10–6] in the final.

Seeds

Draw

Draw

References
 Main Draw

BBandT Atlanta Open - Doubles
2012 Doubles